is a Japanese actor and singer. His debut role was as the Eagle Sazer in the tokusatsu series Chousei Kantai Sazer-X, but he is most well known for playing Harukaze Kurobane in the Prince of Tennis musicals in 2006.

Before he debuted in showbiz, he was a tango dancer and instructor.

Filmography

TV Series
 Onna rule as Jun (NTV, 2013)
 Shuchakueki Shirizu Ushio keiji VS jiken kisha Saeko 9-to (TV Asahi, 2012)
 Medical investigator Mr. Kazuichi Noguchi as Omiyama (Fuji TV, 2011)
 Kaizoku Sentai Gokaiger as Special Duty Officer Barizorg/Sid Bamick (TV Asahi, 2011)
 Majo Saiban (The Witch Trial) (Fuji TV, 2009)
 Oretachi wa Tenshi da! (TV Tokyo, 2009, ep 9)
 Gokusen 3 as Narita (NTV, 2008, ep 5)
 Tokyo Ghost Trip as 'Reaper' (Tokyo MX, 2008)
 Guren Onna as 'Kenduka Kogoro' (TV Tokyo, 2008)
 Four Lies as 'Sakamoto' (TV Asahi, July - December 2008)
 Fuma no Kojiro as 'Ryoma' (Tokyo MX, 2007)
 Sakurasho no Onnatachi (Women Police Sakura) as 'Yamato Sho' (TV Asahi, 2007)
 Happy Boys as 'Inada Gen/Silk' (TV Tokyo, 2007)
 Doyo Wide Gekijo (Saturday Wide Theater: in 'Disguise' 3) as 'Investigator Aso Yuki' (TV Asahi, 2006)
 Aru Ai no Uta (Love Story) (TBS, 2006)
 Chousei Kantai Sazer-X as 'Ad'/Eagle Sazer (TV Tokyo, Nov 2005 - June 2006)

Films
 Kaizoku Sentai Gokaiger the Movie: The Flying Ghost Ship as Special Duty Officer Barizorg (voice) (2011)
 Gokaiger Goseiger Super Sentai 199 Hero Great Battle as Special Duty Officer Barizorg (voice) (2011)
 Toricon!!! Triple Complex Returns as Esu/'Ace' (2008)
 Toricon!!! Triple Complex as Esu/'Ace' (2008)
 Chousei Kantai Sazer X - Tatakae! Hoshi no Senshitachi (Toho, 2005)

TV Programs 
 Today's Health (NHK, April 2006 - March 2007)
 Eight men & women entertainers desert island castaway Diary (TV Tokyo, 2006)
 Waratte Ii tomo! You're Laughing! (Fuji TV, 2006)

Stage Performances 
 Snow White (2011)
 La Corda d’oro as Kanazawa Hiroto (Kanayan) (2010)
 Murder Factory (2010)
 Knock Out Brother X (2009) 
 Letter as 'Takeshi Shima' (2008)
 Fuma no Kojiro - the musical as 'Ryoma' (2007)
 PIPPIN - broadway musical (2007)
 Tennis no Ojisama Prince of Tennis as 'Kurobane Harukaze' (2006)

Internet Radio 
 MRW (March 2007 - May 2008)
 MRW-X (currently ongoing from April 2008)

Discography

Album
 MRW Mini Album - Shindo Gaku, Kiriyama Ren & Chieko Higuchi (Feb 27, 2008)

Soundtracks & CDs
 Toricon!!! Triple Complex' original soundtrack (2008)
 'Fuma no Kojiro' original soundtrack (Dec, 2007)
 'Happy Boys' Image Collection 4 - Inada Gen (Shindo Gaku) (May, 2007)
 'Prince of Tennis' musical best actor's series 006 - IRE as 'Amane Hikaru' & Shindo Gaku as 'Kurobane Harukaze' (Dec, 2006)

DVD
 'Happy Boys' File. 1 - Kyoichi & Gen (Sept, 2007)
 Men's DVD series: R - Shindo Gaku (Feb, 2007)

Theme songs

 'Beside on You' - Toricon!!! Triple Complex
 'Shut it into the mirror' (Ryoma) - Fuma no Kojiro
 'Tenshi no Namida' - Happy Boys

Photobook 
 Majestic (2007)

Dance Performances 

 TANGORIBERUTA (2003)
 Argentinian tango at a dinner party
He also appeared in other tango events as a professional dancer.

External links 
 Official site (Ohta Productions) (Japanese)
 Official blog (Japanese)

Japanese male actors
Living people
1980 births